The Burlington, IA-IL Micropolitan Statistical Area, as defined by the United States Census Bureau, is an area consisting of two counties – one in southeast Iowa and the other in west central Illinois, anchored by the city of Burlington, Iowa.

As of the 2000 census, the μSA had a population of 50,564 (though a July 1, 2009 estimate placed the population at 48,412).

Counties
Des Moines County, Iowa
Henderson County, Illinois

Communities
Places with more than 20,000 inhabitants
Burlington, Iowa (Principal city)
Places with 1,000 to 10,000 inhabitants
Dallas City, Illinois (partial)
Mediapolis, Iowa
Oquawka, Illinois
West Burlington, Iowa
Places with 500 to 1,000 inhabitants
Danville, Iowa
Middletown, Iowa
Stronghurst, Illinois
Places with less than 500 inhabitants
Biggsville, Illinois
Gladstone, Illinois
Gulf Port, Illinois
Lomax, Illinois
Media, Illinois
Raritan, Illinois
Unincorporated places
Augusta, Iowa
Carman, Illinois
Carthage Lake, Illinois
Decorra, Illinois
Hopper, Illinois
Olena, Illinois
Shokonon, Illinois
Sperry, Iowa

Townships

Des Moines County
 Benton Township
 Burlington Township
 Concordia Township
 Danville Township
 Flint River Township
 Franklin Township
 Huron Township
 Jackson Township
 Pleasant Grove Township
 Tama Township
 Union Township
 Washington Township
 Yellow Springs Township

Henderson County
 Bald Bluff Township
 Biggsville Township
 Carman Township
 Gladstone Township
 Lomax Township
 Media Township
 Oquawka Township
 Raritan Township
 Rozetta Township
 Stronghurst Township
 Terre Haute Township

Demographics
As of the census of 2000, there were 50,564 people, 20,635 households, and 13,911 families residing within the μSA. The racial makeup of the μSA was 94.47% White, 3.03% African American, 0.22% Native American, 0.51% Asian, 0.04% Pacific Islander, 0.60% from other races, and 1.12% from two or more races. Hispanic or Latino of any race were 1.61% of the population.

The median income for a household in the μSA was $36,598, and the median income for a family was $43,745. Males had a median income of $33,060 versus $21,815 for females. The per capita income for the μSA was $18,579.

See also
Iowa statistical areas
Illinois statistical areas

References

 
Burlington, Iowa
Geography of Des Moines County, Iowa
Geography of Henderson County, Illinois
Micropolitan areas of Illinois
Micropolitan areas of Iowa